The Trade in Endangered Species Act is an Act of Parliament that was passed in New Zealand in 1989. It is administered by the Department of Conservation.

See also
Wildlife smuggling in New Zealand
Conservation in New Zealand
CITES

References

External links
Text of the Act

Statutes of New Zealand
1989 in New Zealand law
Nature conservation in New Zealand
Wildlife smuggling
Endangered species